The Six Men is a 1951 British crime film directed by Michael Law and starring Harold Warrender, Olga Edwardes and Peter Bull. It was made by the independent Vandyke Productions at the Riverside Studios in Hammersmith. It also used location shooting around London.

Premise
With the assistance of his daughter, a Scotland Yard detective pursues and captures a gang of six criminals.

Cast
 Harold Warrender as Supt. Holroyd  
 Olga Edwardes as Christina Frazer 
 Peter Bull as Walkeley  
 Avril Angers as herself  
 Desmond Jeans as Colonel  
 Michael Evans as Hunter  
 Ivan Craig as Wainwright  
 Reed De Rouen as Lewis  
 Christopher Page as Johnny the Kid  
 Louis Wiechert as the Mole
 Judith Furse as Captain Emsley
 Michael O'Halloran as Assistant Commissioner
 Macdonald Parke as McGraw

References

Bibliography
 Chibnall, Steve & McFarlane, Brian. The British 'B' Film. Palgrave MacMillan, 2009.

External links

1951 films
British crime films
1951 crime films
Films shot at Riverside Studios
Films set in London
Films shot in London
British black-and-white films
1950s English-language films
1950s British films